The Cursed Village (Spanish: La aldea maldita) is a 1930 Spanish silent drama film directed by Florián Rey and starring Carmen Viance, Pedro Larrañaga and Amelia Muñoz. Rey remade the film in 1942.

Cast
 Carmen Viance as Acacia  
 Pedro Larrañaga as Juan de Castilla 
 Amelia Muñoz as Magdalena  
 Pilar Torres as Fuensantica  
 Ramón Meca as Tío Lucas  
 Víctor Pastor as El Abuelo  
 Antonio Mata as Gañán  
 Modesto Rivas as El Administrador 
 José Baviera 
 Ricardo Núñez

References

Bibliography
 Bentley, Bernard. A Companion to Spanish Cinema. Boydell & Brewer 2008.

External links 

1930 films
Spanish silent films
1930s Spanish-language films
Films directed by Florián Rey
Spanish drama films
1930 drama films
Spanish black-and-white films
Films about internal migration
Silent drama films